Suriano is an Italian surname. Notable people with the surname include:

Domenico Suriano (born 1988), Italian footballer
Francesco Suriano, 15th-century Italian Franciscan friar and Holy Land traveller
Francisco Suriano (born 1978), Salvadoran swimmer
Giuseppina Suriano (1915-1950), Italian Roman Catholic
Philip Suriano (born 1948), American actor

Italian-language surnames